Justin Matthew Carmack (March 12, 1981 – July 20, 2000) was an American child actor, known for his appearance in the television series  Full House.

He died on July 20, 2000, in a traffic accident in California. He was buried in the Santa Ana Cemetery.

Filmography

Television

Film

References

External links

1981 births
2000 deaths
American male child actors
American male film actors
Road incident deaths in California
20th-century American male actors